Abdelkrim Brahmi a.k.a. Rim'K (born 21 June 1978 in Paris, France) is an Algerian–French rapper. Rim'K was raised in the Parisian suburb of Vitry-sur-Seine. His family is originally from  Barbacha in Algeria and is mentioned many times in his lyrics.

He is a member of the group 113 alongside Mokobé and AP and the super-group music collective Mafia K-1 Fry. He also has a group called Maghreb United.

Having been innovative in many musical aspects, such as the introduction of Maghrebian folk rhythms in rap. Rim'K thus remains one of the major figures of the French-speaking rap scene.

His musical success, which can be explained both in the quality of his art and in his artistic finds, also comes from the fact that Rim'K is perceived as a link linking the Maghreb to France and that his longevity in music has made him a father figure to many french rap listeners.

Discography

Albums
Solo

with 113
1998 : Ni Barreaux, Ni Barrières, Ni Frontières (EP) 
1999 : Les Princes De La Ville 
2002 : 113 Fout La Merde 
2003 : 113 Dans L'urgence 
2005 : 113 Degrés
2006 : Illégal Radio (hosted by 113)
2010 : Universel 
with Mafia K'1 Fry
2003 : La cerise sur le ghetto 
2007 : Jusqu'à la mort 
2007 : Jusqu'à la mort'' re-edition

EPs

Singles

Other charted songs

Featured in

References

External links
 Official Rim'K website
 Official Rim'K Myspace
 Official Rim'K Skyblog
 La Beurgeoisie The French website for successful "Beurs".

1978 births
Living people
French musicians
French people of Kabyle descent
French rappers
Kabyle people
Musicians from Paris
People from Vitry-sur-Seine
French people of Algerian descent
Rappers from Val-de-Marne